Birra may refer to:
 Al-Bireh, historically known as Birra, a city in Palestina
 Al-Bireh, Rashaya, historically known as Birra, a town in Lebanon
 Ali Birra (born 1947), Oromo singer and poet

See also 
 , mostly names of brewing companies
 Bira (disambiguation)